Augustina is a given name, and may refer to:

 Augustina Stridsberg, Soviet spy
 Enriqueta Augustina Rylands (1843–1908), founder of the John Rylands Library

Other uses
Augustina (grape), another name for the Italian wine grape Prié blanc

See also

 Agustin
 Agustina
 Agustini
 Agustino
 Augustin
 Augustine
 Augustini
 Augustino

Given names